Ron Wilson (5 June 1915 – 20 September 1984) was a former Australian rules footballer who played with Melbourne and St Kilda in the Victorian Football League (VFL). He also played for Victorian Football Association club Coburg, crossing without a clearance in 1941 during the throw-pass era, before returning to St Kilda in 1945 after his suspension for crossing without a clearance had expired.

Notes

External links 

1915 births
Australian rules footballers from Victoria (Australia)
Melbourne Football Club players
St Kilda Football Club players
Coburg Football Club players
1984 deaths